The Accipitriformes (from Latin accipiter/accipitri- "hawk", and New Latin -formes "having the form of") are an order of birds that includes most of the diurnal birds of prey, including hawks, eagles, vultures, and kites, but not falcons.

For a long time, the majority view was to include them with the falcons in the Falconiformes, but many authorities now recognize a separate from Accipitriformes. A DNA study published in 2008 indicated that falcons are not closely related to the Accipitriformes, being instead more closely related to parrots and passerines. Since then, the split and the placement of the falcons next to the parrots in taxonomic order has been adopted by the American Ornithological Society's South American Classification Committee (SACC), its North American Classification Committee (NACC), and the International Ornithological Congress (IOC). The British Ornithologists' Union already recognized the Accipitriformes, and has adopted the move of Falconiformes. The DNA-based proposal and the NACC and IOC classifications include the New World vultures in the Accipitriformes, while the SACC classifies the New World vultures as a separate order, the Cathartiformes.

Characteristics 
The Accipitriformes are known from the Middle Eocene and typically have a sharply hooked beak with a soft cere housing the nostrils. Their wings are long and fairly broad, suitable for soaring flight, with the outer four to six  primary feathers emarginated.

They have strong legs and feet with raptorial claws and opposable hind claws. Almost all Accipitriformes are carnivorous, hunting by sight during the day or at twilight. They are exceptionally long-lived, and most have low reproductive rates.

The young have a long, very fast-growing fledgling stage, followed by 3–8 weeks of nest care after first flight, and 1 to 3 years as sexually immature adults. The sexes have conspicuously different sizes and sometimes a female is more than twice as heavy as her mate. This sexual dimorphism is sometimes most extreme in specialized bird-eaters, such as the Accipiter hawks. Monogamy is the general rule, although an alternative mate is often selected if one dies.

Taxonomy 
Accipitriformes, currently with 262 species and 75 genera in 4 extant families and possibly 1 extinct family, is the largest diurnal raptor order. DNA sequence analyses suggest that divergences within Accipitriformes began around the Eocene/Oligocene boundary about 34 mya, with the split of the group including genera Elanus and Gampsonyx from the other Accipitriformes genera.

The order includes the following families:
Order Accipitriformes
 Accipitridae (vultures, eagles, harriers, hawks, kites)
 Pandionidae (ospreys) (1 or 2 species)
 Cathartidae (Cathartid vultures and condors)
 Sagittariidae (secretarybird)
Possibly includes the extinct Teratornithidae as well.

For a complete list of species, see list of Accipitriformes species.

Phylogeny based on Nagy, J. & Tökölyi, J. (2014).

Footnotes

References 
 
  Full text via AOU, COPO, BioOne.
  Includes a review of recent literature on the controversy.
 
 
 
 
 
  Falconiformes was resequenced in version 4.1 (Jan 7, 2014)

External links

 
Extant Lutetian first appearances
Bird orders
Eocene taxonomic orders
Oligocene taxonomic orders
Miocene taxonomic orders
Pliocene taxonomic orders
Pleistocene taxonomic orders
Holocene taxonomic orders
Taxa named by Louis Jean Pierre Vieillot